

Criteria
A locomotive or train can play many roles in art, for example:
 As the main subject of a painting, sculpture, or photograph
 As a work of art in itself in addition to most functional considerations, especially in streamlined steam locomotives and luxury passenger accommodations of the early 20th century, known also as the Machine Age
 As a subject for a novel or film
 As a metaphor in song or poetry, particularly for physical power or directed movement (physical, romantic (phallic) or other), as in Fisherman's Blues:
"I wish I was the brakeman
on a hurtling, fevered train
crashing headlong into the heartland
like a cannon in the rain" 

In 1978, the Centre Georges Pompidou in Paris held the exhibition "Les Temps des Gares" with the Palais des Beaux-Arts in Brussels, the National Railway Museum in York, and the Leonardo da Vinci Museum of Science and Technology in Milan.

In 2008, Liverpool's Walker Art Gallery held an exhibition entitled: "Art in the Age of Steam."

Trains in specific artworks

The following list is in chronological order, oldest to youngest:
 Rain, Steam and Speed – The Great Western Railway, by J. M. W. Turner, 1844
 The Berlin-Potsdam Railway, by Adolph von Menzel, 1847 
 Gnome Watching Railway Train, by Carl Spitzweg, 1848
 The Railway Station, by William Powell Frith, 1862
 The Travelling Companions, by Augustus Egg, 1862
 Lordship Lane Station, by Camille Pissarro, c. 1870
 The Railway, by Édouard Manet, 1872
 Arrival of the Normandy Train, Gare Saint-Lazare, by Claude Monet, c. 1877
 Le Pont de l'Europe, by Gustave Caillebotte, 1880
 Mont Sainte-Victoire and the Viaduct of the Arc River Valley, by Paul Cézanne, 1882–1885
 The Lineman, by L A Ring, 1884
 States of Mind I:The Farewells, by Umberto Boccioni, 1911
 The Anxious Journey, by Giorgio de Chirico, 1913
 Railroad Sunset, by Edward Hopper, 1929
 Time Transfixed, by René Magritte, 1938
 Rolling Power, by Charles Sheeler, 1939
 Night Train (1947), Train in Evening (1957), Station in the Forest (1960) and The Sacrifice of Iphigenia (1968), by Paul Delvaux
 Horse and Train, by Alex Colville, 1954
 The Sources of Country Music, by Thomas Hart Benton, 1975
 Jim Beam - J.B. Turner Train, by Jeff Koons, 1986
 Brick Train, by David Mach, 1997

Artists specialising in trains
In the United Kingdom the Guild of Railway Artists is a group of painters of railway subjects.

See also

 Bridges in art
 Landscape art
 Marine art

References

Further reading
 Art in the Age of Steam, Walker Art Gallery, National Museums Liverpool, 10–18 April 2008
 "Les Temps des Gares." Paris: Centre Georges Pompidou Centre de Creation Industrielle. 1978.
 Painting trains: Full steam ahead, Tom Lubbock, The Independent, 30 April 2008, pp. 12–13
 Tomoki Akimaru, "Cézanne and the Steam Railway (1)～(7)", 2012

External links

 
Visual arts genres
+Art
19th century in the arts
20th century in the arts